Inf or INF may refer to:

Politics 
 Intermediate-Range Nuclear Forces Treaty, a 1987 arms control treaty between the United States and the Soviet Union
 International Naturist Federation, the global umbrella organisation representing official national naturist societies
 International Netball Federation, the international governing body for the sport of netball
 Irish National Federation, a nationalist political party in Ireland 1891–1900

Computing 
 INF file, a file extension (information file) used by software and hardware driver installation routines
 INF help file, a binary help file created after compiling IPF help source with IBM or Open Watcom's help compiler.
 Informatics (academic field), the science of information and the practice of information processing

Mathematics 
 Infinity, referring to something without any limit
 Infimum, the greatest lower bound of a subset of a partially ordered set

Places 
 In Guezzam Airport, Algeria
 INF Clairefontaine, France national football team centre

Anatomy 
 Inferior, an anatomical terms of location

Biology 
 Inflammation, part of the immune response to tissue damage or infection

Military 
 Infantry, land based soldiers who are specifically trained for the role of fighting on foot

People 
 Issey Nakajima-Farran, Canadian soccer player